Willie D. Warren (September 11, 1924 – December 30, 2000) was an American electric blues guitarist, bass player and singer. In a long career, he worked with Otis Rush, Al Benson, Little Sonny Cooper, David Honeyboy Edwards, Baby Boy Warren, Guitar Slim, Freddie King, Jimmy Reed, Morris Pejoe, Bobo Jenkins and Jim McCarty. One of Warren's better-known recordings was "Baby Likes to Boogie".

He was described by the Allmusic journalist Michael G. Nastos as "one of the Midwest's true blues treasures".

Biography
Warren was born in Stamps, Arkansas, and moved with his family to Lake Village, Arkansas, when he was 13 years old. He was taught by Caleb King to play the guitar, and played in his own blues ensemble around the Mississippi Delta. He taught guitar techniques to his band's singer, Guitar Slim, and they toured around Louisiana in the latter half of the 1940s.

Warren relocated to Chicago by the early 1950s and joined Otis Rush's band. He later played alongside Freddie King and Jimmy Reed, and he backed Morris Pejoe on tracks recorded for Chess Records.

Back in Arkansas in 1959, Warren formed the House Rockers. By the early 1970s he had moved to Detroit to work and record with Bobo Jenkins. From 1974 to 1976 he was also a featured performer, along with Baby Boy Warren (no relation), with the Progressive Blues Band, a popular blues band that performed in many of Detroit's best blues venues. When Baby Boy Warren died, in 1977, Willie D. Warren took up the duties of frontman for the band.
 
In 1977, Warren recorded his first solo album, which was released on Jenkins's label, Big Star. Warren also wrote songs, including two—"Door Lock Blues" and "Detroit Jump"—that Jenkins recorded for his album Detroit All Purpose Blues. Warren's recordings have been issued on two compilation albums. His live album, Live, recorded for the No Cover Productions label, was not released until after Warren's death. His backing band at that time, Mystery Train, included his old friend Jim McCarty.

Warren died in Detroit, in December 2000, at the age of 76. He left one son, Willie Hairston.

The Detroit Blues Society posthumously recognized Warren's contribution to the blues with its 2011 Lifetime Achievement Award.

Partial discography

Albums
Live (2005), Willie D. Warren & Mystery Train (No Cover Productions)
Last Blues: The Detroit Sessions Vol 1 and Vol 2 (2015), Willie D. Warren featuring Howard Glazer

Compilation albums
Hastings Street Grease Vol. 1 (1998), Blue Suit Records
Hastings Street Grease Vol. 2 (1999), Blue Suit Records

See also
List of Detroit blues musicians

References

External links
Warren & Mystery Train photographs at Backstagegallery.com

1924 births
2000 deaths
American blues guitarists
American male guitarists
American blues singers
Songwriters from Arkansas
Electric blues musicians
Detroit blues musicians
Blues musicians from Arkansas
People from Stamps, Arkansas
People from Lake Village, Arkansas
20th-century American singers
20th-century American guitarists
Singers from Arkansas
Guitarists from Arkansas
20th-century American male singers
American male songwriters